Buenoa marki is a species of backswimmer in the family Notonectidae. It is only known from the solution holes near the Pinelands Trail in Everglades National Park, Florida, although it may occur elsewhere.

References

Notonectidae
Insects described in 1971
Everglades National Park
Everglades
Endemic fauna of Florida